Marco Flores y La Jerez, or simply Banda Jerez is a Mexican banda group from Jerez, Zacatecas, Mexico formed in the late 1980s. Among Banda Jerez's many hits include "Billete Verde", "Una Mujer Casada" "Tan Bonita", "Cerveza Helada", "La Cabrona", "La Baraja", "Tamarindo", and "La Iguana". The band was named after Jerez de García Salinas, Zacatecas, Mexico, where it was founded. Banda Jerez re-works traditional ranchera songs, from Antonio Aguilar, Vicente Fernández, Heriberto Lazcano and José Alfredo Jiménez . The ensemble of members consist of vocalists Marco Antonio Flores, and Rafael Juárez, and three clarinetists, three trumpeters, three trombonists, two tenor horns, a tambora, a tarola, and a sousaphone player. 

In July 2012, the vocalist Marco Flores was kidnapped along with a friend, and they were held ransom for about a month.  His family agreed to pay a ransom of five million pesos to secure their release.

Albums
Mujeres y Mentiras  was released in August 2007. The album contained the songs including "El Toro Bermejo" and "La Iguana". A second album was released in September 2008. Dicen Que Soy Borracho and contains 13 songs including "El Alegre", "El Negrito No Es Mio", "Te Advierto", "La Virginia", "El Zacatecano" and "Los Bueyes". The third album  Me Vale Ver Gatos released in October 2009, contains 12 songs including "Me Vale Ver Gatos Bravos", "La Cumbia de Remo", "El Hombre Que Más Te amo","Pobre del Pobre" and "Que Suene la Banda".

Discography
2004 Corazon Ranchero
2005 Billete Verde
2006 Me Gustan Las Viejas Buenas
2007 20 Tamborazos
2007 Mujeres Y Menras
2008 Dicen Que Soy Borracho
2009 Tributo A La Revolucion Mexicana
2009 Me Vale Ver Gatos Bravos
2010 Enamorado Y Parrandero
2010 Corridazos
2011 Puro Zacatecas
2012 Me Voy A Embriagar
2012 De Nueva Cuenta
2013 Gracias
2013 La Puerta Del Rancho
2014 Esta Noche Cena Pancho
2014 Soy El Bueno

References

External links
 The Number One Banda Jerez

Mexican musical groups
Banda music groups